Ayano Shimizu was the defending champion, but lost to Sakura Hondo in the first round.

Rebecca Marino won the title, defeating Yuki Naito in the final, 6–4, 7–6(7–0).

Seeds

Draw

Finals

Top half

Bottom half

References

Main Draw

Kurume U.S.E Cup - Singles
Kurume Best Amenity Cup